

1989–90 season

Schedule and results

1990–91 season

Schedule and results

1991–92 season

Schedule and results

1992–93 season

Schedule and results

1993–94 season

Schedule and results

1994–95 season

Schedule and results

1995–96 season

Schedule and results

1996–97 season

Schedule and results

1997–98 season

Schedule and results

1998–99 season

Schedule and results

References

1990